The sequin (Venetian and  ) is a gold coin  minted by the Republic of Venice from the 13th century onwards.

No other coin design has ever been produced over such a long historical period.

The reverse bears a motto in Latin hexameter:  ("Christ, let this duchy that you rule be given to you").

History

In some regions, in later centuries, this type of coin was stitched to women's clothing such as headdresses – this eventually led to the origin of the more modern word "sequins" to denote small shiny, circular decorations. Following the Venetian model, similar coins were used for centuries throughout the Mediterranean. After two hundred years of continuous  production, the Byzantine Empire imitated with the basilikon. In 1478, the Ottoman Empire introduced a similar unit. In 1535, the Knights Hospitaller of Malta did so. The Ottoman and the Maltese coins were also gold.

See also
Sequin

Further reading
Zecchini (Sequin) by the Knights Hospitallers

References

External links 

The Dictionary of Coin Denominations

Coinage of the Republic of Venice
Gold coins
Medieval currencies
Modern obsolete currencies
Obsolete Italian currencies